Cloudbric Labs is a collection of free web security resources and tools, provided by the cloud-based web security provider Cloudbric. It’s designed for use by developers, webmasters, and end users who are interested in achieving and maintaining basic website security.

Components 
Cloudbric Labs is composed of:
 BlackIPedia: Comprehensive set of malicious (or “black”) IP addresses, updated every 24 hours with real data generated from attacks detected by Cloudbric’s WAF (Web application firewall)
 Threat Index: Analyzed reports of the most recent web-related vulnerabilities
 WAFER: An evaluator that tests the detection capabilities (performance) of widely-used WAFs

An API is offered to allow users to integrate information from Cloudbric Labs to their own security platforms.

Awards
 Gold Award for Cybersecurity Project of the Year (Asia-Pacific) for at 2018 Cybersecurity Excellence Awards.

References

External links 
 https://web.archive.org/web/20180424075416/https://labs.cloudbric.com/ Cloudbric Labs Homepage. Retrieved 2018-03-22.

Internet security